Peter Brown (9 October 1906 – 1 January 1988) was an Australian rules footballer who played for North Melbourne in the Victorian Football League (VFL) in 1928.

References

External links

1906 births
1988 deaths
North Melbourne Football Club players
Dimboola Football Club players
Australian rules footballers from Victoria (Australia)